Clepsis virescana, the light brown apple moth, is a species of moth of the family Tortricidae. It is found in North America, where it is widespread in southern Canada and most of the United States. The habitat consists of shrubby open areas and aspen parkland.

The length of the forewings is 6.4–9.1 mm. The ground colour of the forewings varies from greyish brown to yellow brown. The hindwings vary from light grey to white. Adults have been recorded on wing from April to September.

The larvae have been recorded feeding on both fresh and decaying leaves of Prunus and Rosa species.

References

Moths described in 1865
Clepsis